William Henry Tebeau (November 23, 1925 – July 5, 2013) in 1948 became the first African-American man to graduate from Oregon State College. He was an engineer for ODOT for 36 years. A residence hall at OSU and Highway 126 between Eugene and Florence are both named after him.

Early life 
William Tebeau was born in Baker, Oregon, United States, to Henry William Tebeau and Frances (née Binor) Tebeau. At age 12, he joined the Boy Scouts of America, earning the Order of the Arrow and eventually becoming an Eagle Scout. In 1943 he graduated from Baker High School.

Education 
Tebeau was admitted to Oregon State, but he was not offered a housing assignment because of his race, nearly a decade prior to Oregon's fair housing laws. He found a job at a fraternity house tending the furnace, in exchange for a room in the basement. He graduated with a degree in chemical engineering in 1948. When he was unable to find work as a chemical engineer, he studied on his own to become a civil engineer.

Engineering career 
Tebeau earned his civil engineering license and joined the Oregon State Highway Department, where he worked for 36 years. He also taught at Chemeketa Community College, where he was named 1970 Teacher of the Year.

Honors 

In May 2014, Oregon State University announced that its new residence hall east of the Kerr Administration Building on Washington Way would be named after Tebeau, the first African-American male to earn a degree from the university.

In January 2016, the Oregon Legislature passed SB 5, designating State Highway 126 between Florence and Eugene as "William Tebeau Memorial Highway".

References

1925 births
2013 deaths
African-American engineers
American civil engineers
Educators from Oregon
Oregon State University alumni
People from Baker City, Oregon
African-American history of Oregon
20th-century African-American people
21st-century African-American people